Benjamin Wait (September 7, 1813 - November 9, 1895) was a Canadian businessman and author. One of his most well-known works is Letters from Van Dieman’s Land, which he published in 1843.

References

 
 
 
 
 

1813 births
1895 deaths
People of pre-Confederation Canada
Pre-Confederation Canadian businesspeople
Upper Canada Rebellion people
Writers from Ontario
Canadian schoolteachers
Canadian newspaper editors
People from Markham, Ontario
19th-century Canadian journalists
Canadian male journalists
19th-century Canadian male writers